The Løken Moraines are a line of north–south trending moraines, about  long, lying from  inland from the Windmill Islands off Antarctica, just east of the bases of Clark, Bailey and Mitchell Peninsulas. The moraines were first mapped from air photos taken by U.S. Navy Operation Highjump (1946–47) and Operation Windmill (1947–48), and were named by Carl R. Eklund for Olav Løken, a Norwegian glaciologist who was a member of the Wilkes Station party, 1957.

References

Moraines of Antarctica
Landforms of Wilkes Land